Kiruhura District is a district in the Western Region of Uganda. The town of Rushere is the site of the district headquarters.

Location
Kiruhura District is bordered by Kamwenge District and Kyegegwa District to the north, Sembabule District to the north-east, Lyantonde District to the east, Rakai District to the south-east, Isingiro District to the south, Mbarara District to the south-west and Ibanda District to the north-west. The coordinates of the district are:-0.2101960, 30.8390492.

Ankole sub-region
The district is part of the larger Ankole sub-region. That sub-region is coterminous with the Ankole Kingdom, which is constitutionally recognized but non-functional as of May 2011. The sub-region was home to an estimated population of 10,577,900 million as of 2020, according to the national census conducted that year.

Overview
The country home of the current Uganda President Yoweri Museveni is in Rwakitura, Nyabushozi County, in Kiruhura District. The Rwakitura home functions like an upcountry State House when the president is visiting.

Population
The 1991 national population census put the district population at about 140,950. In 2002, the national census estimated the population at 212,220, with an estimated annual growth rate of 3 percent. In 2012, the population was estimated at 300,800.

Economic activities
Kiruhura District is a farming district. Livestock forms the backbone of economic activity in the district. The animals raised include:
 Ankole cattle
 Exotic cattle breeds
 Hybrid cattle - mixtures of exotic and Ankole breeds
 African Goats
 Boer goats
 Hybrid goats - mixtures of Boer goats and African goats

Milk and meat are important products produced in the district. In 2006, it was estimated that the district produced more than 100,000 liters of milk daily.

Amos Dairies Uganda Limited, a subsidiary of Amos Dairies Limited, is setting up a milk-processing plant at Akageti in Kiruhura District, with capacity to process more than 2 million litres of milk annually.

See also
 Districts of Uganda

References

External links
Location of Kiruhura District At Google Maps

 
Ankole
Districts of Uganda
Western Region, Uganda